Georg Maurer (11 March 1907 – 4 August 1971) was a German poet, essayist, and translator. He wrote under the pseudonyms Juventus, murus, and Johann Weilau.

The son of a teacher, he was born in Szászrégen, Austria-Hungary (now in Romania), and grew up there before moving to Germany in 1926. He studied art history, Germanistics and philosophy in Leipzig and Berlin until 1932. He was a soldier during the Second World War. From 1955, he was a lecturer, then a professor at the Johannes R. Becher Institute of Literature in Leipzig, where he had great influence on the poets of the Saxon School. He died in Potsdam at the age of 64 and was buried in the Südfriedhof in Leipzig.

Prizes and awards 
Literaturpreis der Stadt Weimar 1948
Johannes-R.-Becher-Preis 1961
Kunstpreis der Stadt Leipzig 1964
Nationalpreis der DDR 1965
F.-C.-Weiskopf-Preis 1972

Werke 
Ewige Stimmen, poems, Haessel Verlag Leipzig 1936
Gesänge der Zeit, hymns and sonnets, Rupert-Verlag Leipzig 1948
Barfuß by Zaharia Stancu, translation, 1951
Zweiundvierzig Sonette Aufbau Verlag Berlin 1953
Die Elemente, poems, Insel Verlag Leipzig 1955
Gedichte aus zehn Jahren, Verlag Volk und Welt Berlin 1956
Der Dichter und seine Zeit, essays and reviews, Aufbau Verlag Berlin 1956
Eine stürmische Nacht by Ion Luca Caragiale, translation, Insel Verlag 1956
Lob der Venus, sonnets, Verlag der Nation Berlin 1956
Poetische Reise Verlag der Nation Berlin 1959
Das Lächeln Hiroshimas by Eugen Jebeleanu, translation, Verlag der Nation 1960
Ein Glückspilz by I. L. Caragiale, translation, Aufbau Verlag 1961
Dreistrophenkalender, poems, Mitteldeutscher Verlag Halle 1961 
Das Unsere, in the series neue deutsche literatur, Heft 8 1962
Gestalten der Liebe, poems, Mitteldeutscher Verlag Halle 1964
Stromkreis, poems, Insel Verlag Leipzig 1964
Im Blick der Uralten, poems, Insel Verlag 1965
Gespräche, poems, Mitteldeutscher Verlag Halle 1967
Essay I, Mitteldeutscher Verlag Halle 1969
Kreise, poems, Mitteldeutscher Verlag Halle 1970
Erfahrene Welt, poems, Mitteldeutscher Verlag Halle 1972
Essay II, Mitteldeutscher Verlag Halle 1973
Ich sitz im Weltall auf einer Bank im Rosental (ed. Eva Maurer) Connewitzer Verlagsbuchhandlung 2007

Bibliography 
 Ursula Püschel: Die Liebe der Dichter: Georg Maurer. In neue deutsche literatur 1988, issue 8, .
 Wolfgang Emmerich: Georg Maurer. In Heinz Ludwig Arnold (Hrsg.): Kritisches Lexikon zur deutschsprachigen Gegenwartsliteratur. Das KLG auf CD-ROM. Zweitausendeins, Frankfurt 2007,  (with comprehensive bibliography).
 Franka Köpp/Roland Lampe/Sabine Wolf (Bearb.): Georg Maurer. 1907–1971. Stiftung Archiv der Akademie der Künste, Berlin 2003, .

External links 
 
 Georg Maurer on Poetenladen.de
 Archive of the Berlin Akademie der Künste: Nachlass Georg Maurer

1907 births
1971 deaths
People from Reghin
Transylvanian Saxon people
German people of German-Romanian descent
20th-century German translators
20th-century German poets
German male poets
German-language poets
20th-century German male writers
German male non-fiction writers